Alan Licht (born June 6, 1968) is an American guitarist and composer, whose work combines elements of pop, noise, free jazz and minimalism.  He is also a writer and journalist.

Biography
Licht was born in New Jersey in 1968. His earliest musical influences, in the 1970s, were mainstream rock bands like the Bee Gees and Wings—he remarks in an interview with Paris Transatlantic magazine that 'What made me want to play guitar was that painting of Wings in concert in the gatefold of Wings Over America. It looked so exciting... I wanted to be part of it.' Later, in school, he listened to punk and no wave bands like Mission of Burma, Hüsker Dü and Sonic Youth. However, his musical trajectory was set when his guitar teacher gave him a copy of Steve Reich's Music for 18 Musicians, which would lead to his discovery of  other minimalist music. Licht majored in Film Studies at Vassar College in New York. Since the 1980s, he has worked and recorded with the bands Love Child, Run On and The Pacific Ocean and with other avant-garde musicians including Jim O'Rourke, Rudolph Grey, and Loren Mazzacane Connors. He has also recorded several solo albums. Alan participated as drummer 42 in the Boredoms 77 Boadrum performance which occurred on July 7th, 2007 at the Empire-Fulton Ferry State Park in Brooklyn, New York.

Musical style
Licht's music draws on a wide range of different styles, from tape-loops, to noisy guitar (sometimes using a prepared instrument), to pure pop music.

Writing
Licht is also a music journalist and writer on minimalist music, and in 2000, he published his first book, An Emotional Memoir of Martha Quinn.  In 2007 Rizzoli published his book Sound Art: Beyond Music, Between Categories. In 2021 his book Common Tones: Selected Interviews with Artists and Musicians 1995-2020 was published by Blank Forms Edition.

Discography

Solo
 Sink the Aging Process  (Siltbreeze 1994)
 The Evan Dando of Noise (Corpus Hermeticum 1997)
 Rabbi Sky (Siltbreeze 1999)
 Plays Well (Crank Automotive 2000)
 A New York MInute (XI 2003)
 YMCA (Family Vineyard 2009)
 Four Years Older (Editions Mego 2013)

with The Blue Humans
 Clear to Higher Time (New Alliance 1992)

with Jandek
 Glasgow Sunday 2005 (Corwood Industries 2008) (Uncredited on 'Tribal Ether')

with Loren Mazzacane Connors
 Live In NYC (New World of Sound 1996)
 Two Nights (Road Cone Records 1996)
 Mercury (Road Cone Records 1997)
 Hoffman Estates (Drag City 1998)
 In France (FBWL 2003)

with Love Child
 Okay? (Homestead 1991)
 Witchcraft (Homestead 1992)

with Run On
 On/Off (Matador 1995)
 Start Packing (Matador 1996)
 No Way  (Matador 1997)

with The Pacific Ocean
 So Beautiful and Cheap and Warm (TeenBeat Records 2002)

with Aki Onda
 Everydays (Family Vineyard 2008)

with Lee Ranaldo and the Dust
 Last Night on Earth (Matador 2013)

Bibliography

Notes

External links

 Alan Licht website.
 Artist page at Drag City website.
 Licht's minimalist music top 10 for Halana magazine.
 Viva Radio's 77 Boadrum Site Profile
 Licht interview with Dan Warburton (Paris Transatlantic)
 Licht interview with Ben Judson (NeoAztlan)
 Alan Licht at Arcane Candy

American experimental guitarists
American male guitarists
American rock guitarists
Vassar College alumni
Living people
1968 births
Drag City (record label) artists
Guitarists from New Jersey
20th-century American guitarists
20th-century American male musicians
Siltbreeze Records artists